Gutierrezia wrightii is a North American species of flowering plant in the family Asteraceae known by the common name Wright's snakeweed. It is native to the southwestern United States (Arizona and New Mexico) and northwestern Mexico (Sonora, Chihuahua, Sinaloa).

The plant produces numerous flower heads in loose arrays. Each head contains 30-60 disc florets with 8-19 yellow ray florets around the edge.

References

External links
 USDA Plants Profile for Gutierrezia wrightii (Wright's snakeweed)
Photo of herbarium specimen at Missouri Botanical Garden, collected in New Mexico in 1851, isotype of Gutierrezia wrightii

wrightii
Flora of Arizona
Flora of Chihuahua (state)
Flora of New Mexico
Flora of Sinaloa
Flora of Sonora
Flora of the Sonoran Deserts
Plants described in 1853
Taxa named by Asa Gray